Harding Creek (also known as Hardin Creek) is a stream in Cass County in the U.S. state of Missouri.

Harding Creek was named after the local Hardin family.

See also
List of rivers of Missouri

References

Rivers of Cass County, Missouri
Rivers of Missouri